Sri Divya (born 1 April 1993) is an Indian actress who works primarily in Tamil and Telugu films. She won Nandi Award for Best Child Actress for Bharati, a Telugu film in 2006.

Early life 
Sri Divya was born in Hyderabad of present-day Telangana on 1 April 1993. Divya has an elder sister, Sri Ramya who also acts in  Telugu and Tamil films. Sri Divya studied in the Kendriya Vidyalaya.

Career 
Sri Divya started her career at the age of three. She has also acted in Telugu television serials.

She made her debut as a heroine in the 2010 Telugu romance film Manasara, directed by Ravi Babu, but the film was a failure. Then she featured in the film Bus Stop (2012) directed by Maruthi, co-starring Prince, which was successful at the box office. It was followed by Mallela Theeram Lo Sirimalle Puvvu in which she played a lonely wife who falls in love with a writer. About her performance, The Hindu wrote, "she looks very charming; the cotton saris bring out the grace in her". Idlebrain.com wrote, "Sri Divya epitomizes the character of an idealistic and independent woman. She did well and deserves applause".

Her Tamil debut was Varuthapadatha Valibar Sangam opposite Siva Karthikeyan, which was directed by Ponram. Sri Divya received very positive reviews from critics for her performance. Baradwaj Rangan wrote, "the actress is good. She knows the language, knows how to work a reaction shot, and she looks like she belongs in this milieu. It will be interesting to see what Tamil cinema makes of her". The Times of India wrote, "But the real surprise is debutant Sri Divya, who, is expressive, and can lip-sync very well, which isn't the case with most of our heroines today". The New Indian Express wrote, "As Latha, debutant Sridivya emotes well, infusing the character with innocence, charm and naughtiness".

In 2014 she  appeared in two Tamil films, Suseenthiran's Jeeva and Vellaikaara Durai.

Filmography

References

External links 
 

1993 births
Living people
Indian film actresses
Actresses in Telugu cinema
Actresses in Tamil cinema
Actresses in Malayalam cinema
21st-century Indian actresses
Actresses from Hyderabad, India
Actresses in Telugu television
Indian television actresses
South Indian International Movie Awards winners